Nigeria women's national under-17 football team, also nicknamed the Flamingoes  is a youth association football team operated under the auspices of Nigeria Football Federation. Its primary role is the development of players in preparation for the senior Nigeria women's national football team. The team competes in the biennial FIFA U-17 Women's World Cup and African U-17 Cup of Nations for Women, which is the top competitions for this age group.

Results and fixtures

Legend

2022

Personnel
Below is the coaching squad for the 2022 FIFA U-17 Women's World Cup.

Players

Current squad
The following 21 players were selected for the 2022 FIFA U-17 Women's World Cup.

Honours
Intercontinental
FIFA U-17 Women's World Cup
Third place: (2022)

Continental
African U-17 Cup of Nations for Women
Winners: 2008, 2010, 2012, 2013 & 2016

Competitive record
The Flamingoes have been to every edition of the FIFA U-17 Women's World Cup missing only the 2018 edition. Before the 2022 edition, they've only gotten as far as the quarterfinals in the 2010, 2012 and 2014 editions respectively. They broke this "jinx" in 2022 by defeating USA in the quarterfinals via penalties after an entertaining and tightly-closed contest during regulation time which ended 1–1.

FIFA U-17 Women's World Cup record

African U-17 Cup of Nations for Women record

See also
Nigeria women's national football team
Nigeria women's national under-20 football team

Notes

References

External links
Nigeria Football Federation (NFF)

under-17
Women's national under-17 association football teams